The 2003 Adamawa State gubernatorial election occurred on April 19, 2003. Incumbent Governor, PDP's Boni Haruna polled 68.55% to win the election for a second term, defeating ANPP's Adamu Modibbo and three other candidates.

Boni Haruna won the PDP nomination at the primary election. He retained Bello Tukur as his running mate.

Electoral system
The Governor of Adamawa State is elected using the plurality voting system.

Results
A total of five candidates registered with the Independent National Electoral Commission to contest in the election. PDP candidate Boni Haruna won election for a second term, defeating four other candidates.

The total number of registered voters in the state was 1,280,204. However, only 74.73% (i.e. 956,664) of registered voters participated in the exercise.

References 

Adamawa State gubernatorial elections
Adamawa State gubernatorial election
Adamawa State gubernatorial election